South Park is a 24-block, 150-acre area of more than 780 structures primarily dating from the 1880s to the early twentieth century. It is located south of downtown Dayton, Ohio, just north of the University of Dayton campus and Woodland Cemetery, and east of Miami Valley Hospital. Mainly residential in character, South Park is significant because of the variety of its architecture, which includes vernacular, cottage, and high style examples, and because of its association with John H. Patterson, founder of the National Cash Register Company.

Slidertown and Patterson 

When Patterson began to develop his factory complex on South Main Street, the area now called South Park was a neighborhood of shacks and shanties called Slidertown. Patterson began to have trouble with boys from Slidertown who broke the glass windows on his new factory, and so, determined to give the boys something else to do by sponsoring community gardens and other beautification projects for the neighborhood. Eventually South Park developed into a pleasant, garden-filled community where factory workers lived side by side with supervisors and Patterson's right-hand men. The late Frederick Law Olmsted, walking along the streets of this quarter, declared that, considering the size of the lots, it was the most beautiful street he had ever seen.

Until the advent of the automobile enabled NCR workers to move further afield, the neighborhood continued to be associated with Patterson's firm, and many company picnics and other functions took place on Park Drive Boulevard in the heart of the district.

Historic district

On August 23, 1984, South Park was registered on the National Register of Historic Places, bounding streets Park Dr., Morton Ave., Hickory St., and Wayne Ave. (No. 84003794). On July 16, 1988, this expanded to encompass Wyoming St., Nathan Pl., Oak St., Alberta St. and Blaine St. (No. 88000857). City of Dayton Ordinance #26219.

In 2007, South Park was chosen by the Dayton chapter of the American Institute of Architects as its community partner. This resulted in the creation of housing designs and landscaping concepts consistent with South Park's participation in Rehabarama in both 2001 and 2007.

Actor Martin Sheen was born in Dayton and raised in the South Park neighborhood on Brown Street.

Architecture

Structures 
The architecture of South Park includes examples of Second Empire, High Victorian Italianate, Queen Anne, Federal and Romanesque Revival in one- and two-story structures of brick and frame. South Park still preserves a sense of close-knit neighborhood whose residents cooperate to maintain the many neighborhood parks which give the district its special flavor.

Landscape 
Commissioned by Patterson, John Charles Olmsted was responsible for the layout of Park Drive's landscape. This boulevard once adorned a fountain centerpiece and waterway running through its middle.

See also
 National Register of Historic Places listings in Dayton, Ohio

References

External links
 South Park Historic District
 Preservation Dayton
 City of Dayton's Official Website
 John Charles Olmsted Website

National Register of Historic Places in Montgomery County, Ohio
Historic districts on the National Register of Historic Places in Ohio
South Park
NCR Corporation